IC 2574, also known as Coddington's Nebula, is a dwarf spiral galaxy discovered by American astronomer Edwin Foster Coddington in 1898. Located in Ursa Major, a constellation in the northern sky, it is an outlying member of the M81 Group. It is believed that 90% of its mass is in the form of dark matter. IC 2574 does not show evidence of interaction with other galaxies. It is currently forming stars; a UV analysis showed clumps of star formation 85 to 500 light-years (26 to 150 pc) in size.

References 

Dwarf spiral galaxies
Ursa Major (constellation)